Badakar Monastery (Mongolian script:   Badakar Süm), alternatively known as Udin Ju (Chinese transcription: Wudang Zhao), is a Tibetan Buddhist monastery of the Gelug sect. It is the largest Tibetan Buddhist monastery in Inner Mongolia, and was designated a Major Historical and Cultural Site Protected at the National Level in 1996.

Names
Badekar Monastery has three names. One is local Mongolian, which is Wudang Temple; Wudang is a Chinese transliteration of the Mongolian word for willow, whilst zhao is a transliteration of the word for temple. Badakar is the formal Mongolian name from oral Tibetan Bämagar/Pemakar (white peony). The formal quadrilingual name, granted in 1756 by the Qianlong emperor, but rarely used, is
 Tibetan name: རྒྱ༌ཆེན་རྟོགས་ལྡན༌གླིང༌། (Gyaqên Dog Dänling, Gyaqêndog Monastery)
 Mongolian name:  (Agu'ih Onolt Monastery)
  (Guangjue Monastery)
 Manchu name: Amba Ulhisu Juktehen

History
The Qing government was a major patron of Tibetan Buddhism in Hohhot and Inner Mongolia more broadly. The association between the government and religion assisted the Qing in maintaining their power in Inner Mongolia. Badekar Monastery was built sometime after the Kangxi era as part of the rapid construction of Tibetan Buddhist structures. The monastery was expanded on a massive scale under the Qianlong emperor, reportedly to pacify the local Mongolian population after the Qing massacred a rebellious group from the Dzungar Basin. The complex also received generous grants and expansion under the Jiaqing emperor and Daoguang emperor.

The monastery is located 54 km from Bugat, but was developed as a major tourist destination during the reforms of the 1980s. In 2001, the area around the monastery was declared a national park.

Architecture
In contrast to other Tibetan Buddhist institutions in Inner Mongolia, Badekar Monastery was constructed according to the layout of Tashi Lhunpo Monastery in Xigazê, thus it incorporates no Han-style architecture. All structures are positioned horizontally along the mountain, with halls along the central access ascending up into the mountains.

Environment
From the late 1990s, it was observed that much of the vegetation near the monastery was receding, streams were drying up, and desert was spreading. The problem has been exacerbated by heavy summer rains, which inundate the dry soil, washing it away. The area in front of the monastery has been urbanised and, in 2009, it was noted that very few willow trees could be found in its vicinity, despite them once having been plentiful.

References

Notes

Works cited

Buddhist temples in Baotou
Gelug monasteries
Tibetan Buddhist temples in Inner Mongolia
Major National Historical and Cultural Sites in Inner Mongolia
Buddhist monasteries in China
Tibetan Buddhism in Asia